Daniel, Danny or Dan Cole may refer to:

 Dan Cole (rugby union) (born 1987), English rugby union player
 Dan H. Cole (1811–1881), American politician
 Dan Cole (musician), lead singer and guitarist for Forever Changed
 Dan Cole, host of a radio sports show on KFXN-FM
 Daniel Cole (footballer), UK player at the 2009 Maccabiah Games
 Danny Cole (born 2000), American artist
 Danny Cole, magician, see List of Academy of Magical Arts Award Winners
 Danny Cole, musician in the band Creepy

See also
Danny Coles, English footballer